The Picture Bible is a comic strip telling of the Bible edited by Iva Hoth with illustrations by Andre LeBlanc. It was first published in full colour form by David C. Cook in 1978.

LeBlanc's The Picture Bible was an influence on The Action Bible by Sergio Cariello for David C. Cook, 2010.

References

1978 books
Biblical comics
Christian comics creators